Furgeson is a surname. Notable people with the surname include:

 Colleen Furgeson (born 1998), Marshallese swimmer
 William Royal Furgeson Jr. (born 1941), American judge

See also
 Ferguson (name)

Scottish surnames